Rebecca Willis is a professor in energy and climate governance at the University of Lancaster in the UK. She researches on the environment and sustainability policy.

Career
Willis's career involves the intersection of the environment, especially climate change and energy, with politics and public policy. She has been part of the Green Alliance, advised government bodies and became a professor at University of Lancaster in 2019.

Willis spent a short time from 1997 to 1998 as a policy advisor at the European Parliament in Brussels. She was then Head of Policy for the Green Alliance charity until 2001 when she became Director of the organisation until 2004. She continues to be associated with the charity. In 2009 she introduced the Alliance's Climate Change Leadership Programme for UK politicians. From 2004 until it was closed in 2011, Willis was vice-chair of the Sustainable Development Commission, an advisory body to the UK governments.

She also undertook independent consultancy from 2004 until 2017. This included advising the Lake District National Park on setting up a local low carbon budget and also the British Academy and Co-operatives UK on models for community ownership of energy. She was a non-academic member of the council of the UK government's Natural Environment Research Council from August 2011 until 2015.

She is one of the expert leads for the UK Climate Assembly that began in 2019. Her role is to help this citizens' assembly stay focused, accurate and balanced when recommending how the UK can achieve net zero carbon emissions by 2050, in line with the Climate Change Act. In partial response to the Covid19 pandemic, the assembly's final report supported economic recovery measures that reduced greenhouse gases and encouraged green changes to lifestyles.

From 2014 Willis has been associated with University of Lancaster and was appointed professor of practice in 2019. In 2020 she was awarded a UK Research and Innovation Future Leaders Fellowship.

Publications
Willis has authored and co-authored books, scientific publications and reports. These include:

 Rebecca Willis (2020) Too Hot to Handle? The Democratic Challenge of Climate Change, Bristol University Press, 162 pp 
 Willis, R. (2020) The role of national politicians in global climate governance. Environment and Planning E: Nature and Space. 3 3 885-903
 Smith, S., Christie, I., Willis, R. (2020) Social tipping intervention strategies for rapid decarbonization need to consider how change happens. Proceedings of the National Academy of Sciences of the United States of America. 117 20 10629-10630
 Willis, R. How Members of Parliament Understand and Respond to Climate Change. The Sociological Review. 66 3 475-491
 Willis, R. (2014) Paris 2015: Getting a global agreement on climate change. Green Alliance. 
 Willis, R. (2006) Grid 2.0: The Next Generation Green Alliance.

Personal life
Willis was born 20 February 1972. She studied BA Social and Policy Sciences at King's College, Cambridge, graduating in 1994 and then in 1996 took a master's degree at the University of Sussex in Environment, Development and Policy. Her doctoral degree was at University of Lancaster in sociology, awarded in 2018. She is divorced and has two sons.

Awards
In November 2020 she was included in the BBC Radio 4 Woman's Hour Power list 2020.

References

Living people
Alumni of King's College, Cambridge
Alumni of the University of Sussex
British charity and campaign group workers
Alumni of Lancaster University
Sustainability advocates
1972 births
British women scientists
UK Research and Innovation Future Leaders Fellowship